Manwaring is a surname. Notable people with the surname include:

Francis Macdonald Manwaring, Canadian politician
George Manwaring (1854–1889), a hymn writer of the Church of Jesus Christ of Latter-day Saints (LDS Church)
Hyrum Manwaring (1877–1856), American president of Ricks College in Rexburg, Idaho from 1930 to 1944. 
Kirt Manwaring (born 1965), professional baseball player
Michael Manwaring (born 1942), American designer and artist
Robert Manwaring, he was an English 18th century furniture designer and cabinet maker.

See also
Frances Manwaring Caulkins (1795–1869), American historian, genealogist, author
Mainwaring, a surname
Mannering, a surname